The following tables compare general and technical information for a number of notable network monitoring systems. Please see the individual products' articles for further information.

Features

Legend 

 Product Name  The name of the software, linked to its Wikipedia article.
 IP SLAs Reports  Support of Cisco's IP Service Level Agreement mechanism.
 Logical Grouping  Supports arranging the hosts or devices it monitors into user-defined groups.
 Trending  Provides trending of network data over time.
 Trend Prediction  The software features algorithms designed to predict future network statistics.
 Auto Discovery  The software automatically discovers hosts or network devices it is connected to.
 Agentless  The product does not rely on a software agent that must run on hosts it is monitoring, so that data can be pushed back to a central server. "Supported" means that an agent may be used, but is not mandatory. An SNMP daemon does not count as an agent.
 SNMP  Able to retrieve and report on SNMP statistics.
 Syslog  Able to receive and report on Syslogs.
 Plugins  Architecture of the software based on a number of 'plugins' that provide additional functionality.
 Triggers/Alerts  Capable of detecting threshold violations in network data, and alerting the administrator in some form.
 WebApp  Runs as a web-based application.
 No: There is no web-based frontend for this software.
 Viewing: Network data can be viewed in a graphical web-based frontend.
 Acknowledging: Users can interact with the software through the web-based frontend to acknowledge alarms or manipulate other notifications.
 Reporting: Specific reports on network data can be configured by the user and executed through the web-based frontend.
 Full Control: ALL aspects of the product can be controlled through the web-based frontend, including low-level maintenance tasks such as software configuration and upgrades.
 Distributed Monitoring  Able to leverage more than one server to distribute the load of network monitoring.
 Inventory  Keeps a record of hardware and/or software inventory for the hosts and devices it monitors.
 Platform  The platform (Coding Language) on which the tool was developed/written.
 Data Storage Method  Main method used to store the network data it monitors.
 License  License released under (e.g. GPL, BSD license, etc.).
 Maps  Features graphical network maps that represent the hosts and devices it monitors, and the links between them.
 Access Control  Features user-level security, allowing an administrator to prevent access to certain parts of the product on a per-user or per-role basis.
 IPv6  Supports monitoring IPv6 hosts and/or devices, receiving IPv6 data, and running on an IPv6-enabled server.  Supports communication using IPv6 to the SNMP agent via an IPv6 address.

See also
Data Cap Integrity Act

References

Network management
Network monitor systems